PC City was a chain of computer superstores owned and run by Dixons Carphone. Established in 1991, it was a continental European equivalent to the PC World brand, which operates in the United Kingdom and Ireland. 

PC City had stores in several countries:
 Sweden – The physical stores closed in 2009. The online outlet switched to the Electro World brand in 2013.
 France – All nine stores closed in 2007.
 Spain – The chain closed all 34 stores in 2011. Most of the stores were sold to Worten.
 Italy – The business was combined with Unieuro, which was merged with Marco Polo in 2013.

References 

Consumer electronics retailers
Currys plc
Retail companies established in 1991
Retail companies disestablished in 2013